The 1979 Schweppes County Championship was the 80th officially organised running of the County Championship. Essex won their first Championship title.

Ten matches were abandoned without a ball being bowled and are not included in the table. The number of points awarded for a tie was increased from 5 to 6 points and the number of points awarded to a side batting last in a drawn match with the scores level also increased from 5 to 6 points. The Championship was sponsored by Schweppes for the second time.

Table
12 points for a win
6 points to each side for a tie
6 points to side still batting in a match in which scores finish level
Bonus points awarded in first 100 overs of first innings
Batting: 150 runs - 1 point, 200 runs - 2 points 250 runs - 3 points, 300 runs - 4 points
Bowling: 3-4 wickets - 1 point, 5-6 wickets - 2 points 7-8 wickets - 3 points, 9-10 wickets - 4 points
No bonus points awarded in a match starting with less than 8 hours' play remaining.
The two first innings limited to a total of 200 overs. The side batting first limited to 100 overs. Any overs up to 100 not used by the side batting first could be added to the overs of the side batting second.
Position determined by points gained. If equal, then decided on most wins.
Each team plays 22 matches.

References

1979 in English cricket
County Championship seasons